George Brian Thompson (born 7 August 1952), known as Brian Thompson, is an English former professional footballer who played as a striker or as a defender in the Football League for York City and Mansfield Town, in non-League football for  Yeovil Town and Maidstone United, and was on the books of Sunderland without making a league appearance. He was capped 15 times by the semi-professional national team from 1979 to 1984.

References

1952 births
Living people
Sportspeople from Ashington
Footballers from Northumberland
English footballers
England semi-pro international footballers
Association football defenders
Association football forwards
Sunderland A.F.C. players
York City F.C. players
Yeovil Town F.C. players
Mansfield Town F.C. players
Maidstone United F.C. (1897) players
English Football League players